Atlético Universidad was a Peruvian football club, playing in the city of Arequipa.

History
The club was 2002 Copa Perú champion, when defeated Atlético Grau in the finals. 

The club have played at the highest level of Peruvian football on three occasions, from 2003 Torneo Descentralizado until 2005 Torneo Descentralizado when was relegated.

Notable players

Honours

National
Copa Perú: 1
Winners (1): 2002

Regional
Región VIII:
Winners (1): 2002
Runner-up (1): 2000, 2001

Liga Departamental de Arequipa:
Winners (3): 2000, 2001, 2002
Runner-up (1): 1975

Liga Provincial de Arequipa:
Winners (5): 1975, 2000, 2001, 2002, 2019
Runner-up (1): 1969

Liga Distrital de Arequipa:
Winners (1): 2019
Runner-up (2): 2014, 2022

References

See also
List of football clubs in Peru
Peruvian football league system

Football clubs in Peru
Association football clubs established in 1964
University and college association football clubs